Stenkilsson is a surname. Notable people with the surname include:

 Eric Stenkilsson, contender for the Swedish kingship 1066–67
 Halsten Stenkilsson, became king of Sweden after his father Stenkil's death in 1066
 Inge the Elder, Inge Stenkilsson (died c. 1100), King of Sweden